iBall is a kinetic toy that displays Newton's Laws.  It consists of a plastic sphere with 7 metal balls.  The toy has numerous goals that can be accomplished (some are printed on the back of the packaging), such as launching one ball at a time into orbit in the plastic ball or trying to get three different balls into orbits in three directions at once.  It was released by Winning Moves Games USA in 2007 but is no longer in production.

Products introduced in 2007
Winning Moves games